Annie Perreault (born 28 July 1971 in Windsor, Quebec) is a Canadian short track speed skater, who won medals in the 500 m and 3000 m relay at the 1998 Winter Olympics. She had already won a relay gold medal at the 1992 Winter Olympics.

References

External links
 
 
 
 

1971 births
Living people
Canadian female short track speed skaters
Olympic short track speed skaters of Canada
Olympic gold medalists for Canada
Olympic bronze medalists for Canada
Olympic medalists in short track speed skating
Short track speed skaters at the 1992 Winter Olympics
Short track speed skaters at the 1998 Winter Olympics
Medalists at the 1992 Winter Olympics
Medalists at the 1998 Winter Olympics
People from Windsor, Quebec
Sportspeople from Quebec
World Short Track Speed Skating Championships medalists
20th-century Canadian women